Gary Hailes (born 4 November 1965 in London) is an English actor.

Hales attended Holloway School. During the 1980s he starred in several successful television series, including Woodentop, Grange Hill and the BBC soap opera EastEnders, where he played Barry Clark from 1986-89. He originally auditioned for the role of Mark Fowler when the series began in 1985, but the role went to David Scarboro instead. Hailes' character was notable for being one half of the soap's first gay couple, introduced as the partner of the yuppie graphic designer, Colin Russell (played by Michael Cashman).

In 1987, Hailes' character Barry Clark caused a great deal of controversy after EastEnders screened the first male-to-male kiss on a UK, prime time soap. The kiss prompted a multitude of complaints from angry viewers and a hostile backlash from the right wing press. Despite the fact that Hailes is heterosexual, he suffered from severe homophobia because of the homosexual role he played in EastEnders. He was attacked several times by members of the public who could not separate fact from fiction, which included being assaulted in a supermarket by a disapproving woman and strangled by a man at a petrol station. Even after he left the show he lost a job as a children's television presenter because of the so-called "gay tag".

Since leaving EastEnders in 1989, he has gone on to appear in films such as The Killing Zone (1999); Murder with Mirrors and Waiting for a Killer. On television he has appeared in ITV police drama The Bill (2001–02); Horizon; Nobody’s Hero and Sorry.

Theatre appearances include Strip Poker; Doctor on the Boil; Gollocks and numerous pantomimes. He has also performed several plays for BBC radio and voice-overs.

As well as acting, Hailes also drove a London taxi.

Hailes is involved with the worldwide Star Wars costuming group, 501st Legion. In his position of Commanding Officer of the UK Garrison, Hailes spends much of his time traveling the country helping to raise money for charities. Hailes appeared as a Stormtrooper, along with five other members of the 501st Legion, in Star Wars: The Force Awakens.

References

External links
 

1965 births
Living people
People educated at Holloway School
English male soap opera actors
English male film actors
English male stage actors